Voetbalvereniging Jubbega (VV Jubbega) is an association football club from Jubbega, Netherlands, founded in 1945 from a merger of two local clubs. Its home games are played at Sportpark it Heidefjild. Jubbega's colors are red and white.

History

20th century 
VV Jubbega was founded on 14 April 1945 through the merger of the Rode Duivels (Red Devils) and Samenspel Doet Overwinnen (Teamworks Wins).

In 1948, it joined the Vierde Klasse of the KNVB, immediately taking a section championship. Since, it has been hovering between the Vierde and Eerste Klasse, peaking in 1963 as third in the Eerste. An exception was 1998–99 when Jubbenga played in the Vijfde Klasse, immediately bouncing back through a section championship and automatic promotion.

21st century 

From 2017 through 2019, former professional player Oebele Schokker played on the Saturday first squad, doubling as assistant coach. In 2019, Jubbega was joined by Xander Houtkoop, another former prof. In 2020, Jubbega promoted to the Eerste Klasse. At the start of 2022, it was joined by the former prof Henrico Drost.

Honors 
 Tweede Klasse championships: 1961, 1966, 1972
 Derde Klasse championships: 1958, 1971, 2018
 Vierde Klasse championships: 1949, 1986, 1989, 1991, 2012, 2016
 Vijfde Klasse championship: 1999

Head coach 
 Henk Konings (2010–11)
 Johnny Wassenaar (2015–18)
 Inne Schotanus (2018–)

References 

Football clubs in the Netherlands
Association football clubs established in 1945
Football clubs in Heerenveen